The 2005 Atlantic Sun men's basketball tournament was held March 3–5 at the Curb Event Center at Belmont University in Nashville, Tennessee. 

 defeated top-seeded  in the championship game, 63–54, to win their fourth (and second consecutive) Atlantic Sun/TAAC men's basketball tournament.

The Golden Knights, therefore, received the Atlantic Sun's automatic bid to the 2005 NCAA tournament.

Format
With the Atlantic Sun's membership remaining stable at eleven teams, no changes were made to the tournament format. As such, only the top eight teams from the conference tournament were eligible for the tournament. These eight teams were seeded based on regular season conference records and were all entered into the quarterfinal round.

Bracket

References

ASUN men's basketball tournament
Tournament
Atlantic Sun men's basketball tournament
Atlantic Sun men's basketball tournament